Spataro is a surname. Notable people with the surname include:

 Emiliano Spataro (born 1976), Argentine racing driver
  (1458–1541), Italian music theorist, composer, and choirmaster
 Giuseppe Spataro (1897–1979), Italian political figure